Linguaphone may refer to:

Linguaphone (company), a language-training provider
Linguaphone (musical instrument) or lamellophone, a class of musical instruments

See also 
Language lab, an audio-visual installation used in language teaching